Nannie de Villiers and Lizzie Jelfs defeated Corina Morariu and Ludmila Varmužová in the final, 6–3, 6–4 to win the girls' doubles tennis title at the 1994 Wimbledon Championships.

Seeds

  Michaela Hasanová /  Martina Nedelková (first round)
  Corina Morariu /  Ludmila Varmužová (final)
  Cristina Moros /  Stephanie Nickitas (quarterfinals)
  Martina Hingis /  Henrieta Nagyová (second round)
  Jeon Mi-ra /  Francesca La'O (quarterfinals)
  Nannie de Villiers /  Lizzie Jelfs (champions)
  Amanda Basica /  Meilen Tu (second round)
  Carmiña Giraldo /  Maria Noel Losada (first round)

Draw

Finals

Top half

Bottom half

References

External links

Girls' Doubles
Wimbledon Championship by year – Girls' doubles